"" (both meaning "Our Land") is the de facto national anthem of Finland. The music was composed by the German immigrant Fredrik Pacius, with original Swedish words by Johan Ludvig Runeberg, and with this music it was performed for the first time on 13 May 1848. Originally, it was written for the 500th anniversary of Porvoo, and for that occasion it was Runeberg himself who wrote the music.

The melody of "Maamme" is also used for the national anthem of Estonia with a similarly themed text, "Mu isamaa, mu õnn ja rõõm" ("My Fatherland, My Happiness and Joy", 1869). It is also considered to be the ethnic anthem for the Livonians as "Min izāmō" ("My Fatherland").

History

The original poem, written in 1846 but not printed until 1848, had 11 stanzas and formed the prologue to the verse cycle The Tales of Ensign Stål ("Fänrik Ståhls sägner"), a classic example of Romantic nationalism. The current Finnish language text is usually attributed to the 1889 translation of Ensign Stål by Paavo Cajander,  but in fact originates from the 1867 translation by Julius Krohn.

In the 1880s and in the 1920s there were more attempts to replace it with a Finnish language version but these ceased by the 1930s. Some Finns have proposed that the Finnish national anthem be set as "Finlandia" by Jean Sibelius,   with lyrics by V.A. Koskenniemi (Finnish) and Joel Rundt (Swedish).

It is said that Pacius composed the tune in four days. It was popular throughout the 19th century, but established to its current position only after Pacius' death.

Status and usage 
There is no law regarding an official national anthem in Finland, in the way the coat of arms and flag of Finland are legally defined. Instead its position has been established gradually by convention over the years.  In 2018, "Maamme" was described by the Government of Finland as the 'Finnish national anthem'.

Even though "Maamme" has become established as the de facto anthem, its status has still been debated from time to time. It has been suggested that "Maamme"'s status as national anthem should be legalised. For example, opposing legislative initiatives were made in 2003 to the Finnish Parliament to make "Maamme" and the Finlandia Hymn the official national anthem.  In 2014, there was a citizens' initiative about choosing the Finlandia Hymn as the national anthem, and in 2016 members the National Coalition Party began campaigning to stop using "Maamme" in favour of the Finlandia Hymn, however, opinions were not unanimous in the party, and the campaign fell short of its goal.

Despite lack of official status, in usage, "Maamme" fills the function of a national anthem the same as in many other countries. For example, it is played during state visits, and is used to represent Finland at international sporting fixtures.

Lyrics
The original lyrics consist of eleven verses, but it is customary to only sing the first verse and the last verse, unless the people gathered are mixed Finnish- and Swedish-speaking. In the latter case, three verses are sung: the first in Finnish, the first in Swedish and the last in Finnish.

International Phonetic Alphabet transcriptions

See also 

 Holidays in Finland
 Finnish national symbols
 "Ålänningens sång" – the regional anthem of Åland
 "Modersmålets sång" - unofficial anthem of the Swedish-speaking Finns

Notes

References

External links 

 History of the Finnish national anthem

1848 songs
European anthems
National symbols of Finland
Finnish-language songs
Finnish songs
National anthems
National anthem compositions in B-flat major
National anthem compositions in D major
Swedish-language songs